Great Wilbraham Common is a  biological Site of Special Scientific Interest west of Great Wilbraham in Cambridgeshire. It is managed by the Commons Right Holders.

This is one of the largest remaining areas of species-rich grassland in the county. Locally uncommon flora include purple milk-vetch, felwort, meadow saxifrage, green-winged orchid and sulphur clover.

There is access by a footpath from Wilbraham Road

References

Sites of Special Scientific Interest in Cambridgeshire